So Hyok-chol (born 19 February 1982) is a North Korean former footballer. He represented North Korea on at least twenty-two occasions between 2001 and 2008, scoring twice.

Career statistics

Club

International

International goals
Scores and results list North Korea's goal tally first, score column indicates score after each North Korea goal.

References

1982 births
Living people
North Korean footballers
North Korea international footballers
Association football defenders
China League One players
Pyongyang Sports Club players
Yanbian Funde F.C. players
North Korean expatriate footballers
North Korean expatriate sportspeople in China
Expatriate footballers in China
2004 AFC Asian Cup players